The Rome City School District is a public school district in Floyd County, Georgia, United States, based in the city of Rome. It serves the city limits of Rome.

Schools
The Rome City School District has six elementary schools, one middle school, and one high school.

Elementary schools 
Anna K. Davie Elementary School
East Central Elementary School
Elm Street Elementary School
Main Elementary School 
North Heights Elementary School ( shut down in 2019/2020)
West Central Elementary School
West End Elementary School

Middle school
Rome Middle School

High schools
Rome High School
Phoenix Performance Learning Center

Guns 
On August 3rd, 2022, a student was found with a handgun and marijuanna located in the boys backpack. The student never threatened anyone, and was immediately removed. The next day, another student was caught with a gun, this time on his person. Once again, the student never threatened anyone, and was immediately removed. After this, the school went on a flexible learning day to call an emergency board meeting to review safety and security measures.

References

External links

School districts in Georgia (U.S. state)
Education in Floyd County, Georgia